is a train station in Nakamura-ku, Nagoya, Aichi Prefecture, Japan.

The station is linked to Nagoya International Center, after which the station is named. A long underground passage links this station directly to Nagoya Station; that is, the network of underground shopping malls and passages extends to this station and includes it.

Lines
Nagoya Municipal Subway Sakura-dōri Line (Station number: S03)

Layout

Platforms

References

External links
 

Railway stations in Japan opened in 1989
Railway stations in Aichi Prefecture